Several classes of minesweeper have been named "M". These include:

 , a class of minesweepers of the Kriegsmarine that saw service during World War II
 , a class of minesweepers of the Royal Netherlands Navy built after World War I
 M-series minesweeper (Sweden), a series of minesweepers of the Royal Swedish Navy; see List of mine warfare vessels of the Swedish Navy

See also
 M class (disambiguation)